Her Forgotten Past is a 1933 American pre-Code mystery film directed by Wesley Ford and starring Monte Blue, Barbara Kent and Henry B. Walthall.

Synopsis
Without telling her wealthy father, Doris Maynard marries the family chauffeur. When he finds out the couple leave together, but after a few months she discovers that her husband is a reckless gambler, who with a warrant out for his arrest goes on the run. Doris returns home and sometime later is courted by a district attorney, but on her father's advice declines to tell him about her recent marriage as it is believed her husband is now dead in an automobile accident.

Cast

References

Bibliography
 Pitts, Michael R. Poverty Row Studios, 1929-1940. McFarland & Company, 2005.

External links
 

1933 films
1933 mystery films
1930s English-language films
American mystery films
Mayfair Pictures films
Films directed by Wesley Ford
1930s American films